The Suffolk Coast Path is a long-distance footpath along the Suffolk Heritage Coast in England.

Previously known as the Suffolk Coast and Heaths Path after the Suffolk Coast and Heaths Area of Outstanding Natural Beauty through which it runs, the path has been rebranded with new waymarkers bearing the new name. 

The path runs along river and sea walls, across marsh, heath, foreshore and cliffs. It starts at Felixstowe  and ends at Lowestoft , via Bawdsey, Snape Maltings, Aldeburgh, North Warren, Thorpeness, Minsmere, Dunwich, Southwold and Kessingland. It connects with the Sandlings Walk and (via the Stour and Orwell Walk) with the Essex Way and the Stour Valley Path.

Much of W. G. Sebald's novel The Rings of Saturn describes a walking tour that roughly follows the Suffolk Coast Path.

See also
Long-distance footpaths in the UK
Sandlings Walk
Stour Valley Path

References

External links
 — Suffolk Coast and Heaths AONB page describing restrictions and re-routing.

Footpaths in Suffolk
Tourist attractions in Suffolk
Long-distance footpaths in England
Coastal paths in England
Suffolk coast